William Allen Fallow (October 7, 1883 – May 3, 1948) was a provincial politician from Alberta, Canada. He served as a member of the Legislative Assembly of Alberta from 1935 to his death in 1948, sitting with the Social Credit caucus in government. From September 3, 1935 to his death, he served as the Minister of Public Works in the Aberhart/Manning governments. He died at an Edmonton hospital, still in office, after a stroke on May 3, 1948.

References

Alberta Social Credit Party MLAs
1948 deaths
1883 births
Members of the Executive Council of Alberta